Ana del aire is a Mexican telenovela produced by Ernesto Alonso for Canal de las Estrellas in 1974. Starring Angélica María and Fernando Allende.

Plot 
Ana is a flight attendant who lives with Andrea, who believes it is his mother who in turn was separated from his father, Esteban; Elena and her sister, who suffered from polio as a child, being invalid and hooks on their legs, so grew complexed with feelings of hatred toward her.

Cast 

 Angélica María as Ana
 Fernando Allende as Gerardo
 Andrés García as Jorge Romero
 Jaime Moreno as Aníbal
 Sasha Montenegro as Dolly
 Susana Alexander as Lola
 Armando Silvestre as Esteban
 Silvia Derbez as Andrea
 María Rubio  as Nadia
 César del Campo as Gastón
 Susana Dosamantes as Norma
 María Eugenia Ríos as Inés
 Lupita D'Alessio as Consuelo
 Miguel Macía as Armando
 Zoila Quiñones as Elena
 Patricia Panini as Vilma
 Daniel Santalucía as Juan
 Alfredo Torres as Luis
 Miguel Ángel Ferriz as Mesero
 Raúl Boxer as Lic. Basurto
 Nélida as Paula Dopson
 Javier Ruán as Alex
 Alicia Palacios as Rosa
 Chela Nájera as Teresa
 José Loza as Miguel Espino
 Héctor Cruz as Tom
 Tita Grieg as Tita

References

External links 

Mexican telenovelas
1974 telenovelas
Televisa telenovelas
Spanish-language telenovelas
1974 Mexican television series debuts
1974 Mexican television series endings